Tom King is a fictional character from the British ITV soap opera Emmerdale, who appeared on the show from 29 February 2004 before being killed off on 25 December 2006 in a long-running "whodunit" storyline dubbed, "Who Killed Tom King?". He was last seen on 27 December 2006 as a dead body in a morgue. Throughout his time on the show he was portrayed by Kenneth Farrington. Farrington decided to leave the show in 2006 but reprised the role briefly as a ghost in a "Text Santa" special on 20 December 2013.

Storylines

Backstory 
Born into a family of successful businessmen, Thomas Albert King grew up in Emmerdale where his father Albert ran a successful business. As an adult, Tom grew away from the family business and founded his own haulage firm, becoming familiar with fellow businessmen such as Frank Tate (Norman Bowler) and Alan Turner (Richard Thorp). Tom fell in love with a Scottish woman named Mary, and he went on to marry her. From their marriage they produced four sons: Jimmy (Nick Miles), Matthew (Matt Healy), Carl (Tom Lister) and Max (Charlie Kemp). When his sons grew up Tom began running his haulage firm with them (with the exception of Max who became a vet), renaming the firm King & Sons.

Mary became ill with terminal cancer and Tom hired nurse Carrie Nicholls (Linda Lusardi) to look after her. Mary eventually died in 1986 and Tom and Carrie began an affair. In 1991, Carrie gave birth to Tom's daughter, Scarlett (Kelsey-Beth Crossley). Tom decided not to tell his sons about their half-sister but did pay for her to attend private school. The last time Tom ever saw Scarlett was when she was one year old.

2004–2006 
Tom goes to the local graveyard to lay flowers on the grave of his late wife, Mary, who had died in 1986. Marlon Dingle (Mark Charnock) was also present, doing the same, leading to the pair talking about their late wives, and Tom revealed that he had grown up in Emmerdale and was keen to return. Tom did move back to Emmerdale but had trouble re-establishing his haulage firm there. To get some inside information on his key competitor, Tate Haulage, Tom sent his son Carl to get a job there and act as a spy. When Carl found out that Tate Haulage planned to bid for a valuable contract, Tom undercut them to win it, moving himself, his family and his haulage firm into Emmerdale. Tom ran King & Sons with his sons, Jimmy, Matthew and Carl, while Jimmy's ambitious ex-wife Sadie (Patsy Kensit) would also prove influential.

After the Kings established themselves as the new top dogs of the village, replacing the Tates, Tom began searching for a partner. He set his eyes on the much younger widow Charity Dingle (Emma Atkins), and was overjoyed when she revealed she felt the same way. However, while Charity genuinely cared for Tom, he had trouble believing an attractive young woman was really interested in him and not his money – especially as most of the village believed Charity had married her late husband Chris Tate (Peter Amory) for the same reason. Things changed when Tom's close friend Roger Dyson (Malcolm Terris) died of a heart attack while playing golf, making him decide life was too short, Tom proposed to Charity and she accepted, and they held a massive engagement party in The Woolpack. However, Tom's family, particularly his daughter-in-law Sadie, were less than impressed, fearing Tom would leave his fortune to Charity rather than them.

When the day of the wedding eventually arrived, Sadie gave Tom photos of Charity kissing her cousin and lover Cain Dingle (Jeff Hordley). Tom subsequently jilted Charity at the altar, sparking a massive fight between the Kings and the Dingle family. Tom became convinced Sadie was the only person out for his best interests; however, Charity was determined to clear her name, and when she obtained proof she took it to Jimmy, who was furious with Sadie. To hurt both Tom and Sadie, Charity seduced Jimmy, who was unaware he was being videotaped. At Jimmy's 40th birthday party Charity marched in and played the video, which Sadie had set her up. Tom was furious and begged Charity to take him back, but she refused, saying that she no longer loves him and left Emmerdale.

After returning for the aborted wedding, Tom's youngest son Max prepared to leave Emmerdale to continue his around-the-world trip with his girlfriend Amy Carter (Bethany Webb). Bent on trying to get his son to remain in Emmerdale, Tom persuaded local vet Paddy Kirk (Dominic Brunt) to give Max a job, with Tom covering his salary. Max subsequently broke up with Amy and moved into Home Farm with Tom, Matthew and Carl. However, when he later discovered the truth Max became tired of his father dictating his life, making plans to flee the village with friend Robert Sugden (Karl Davies). The plan ended in tragedy when Robert crashed the car, which exploded with Max inside, killing him instantly. Tom was devastated to realise he had virtually driven his youngest son to his tragic death.

Determined to get back into Tom's good books, Sadie blackmailed Charity's ex-sister-in-law Zoe Tate (Leah Bracknell) into selling Home Farm – the Tate family home, which Tom dreamed of owning – to Tom. However, in an act of revenge, Zoe destroyed the house by deliberately damaging the gas pipes just as she fled abroad, leaving Tom with a huge refurbishment bill. In spite of this disaster, a vulnerable Tom let Sadie back into the fold and, with Sadie's marriage to Jimmy in tatters, Tom began to wonder if her feelings for him were more than those of a "daughter". Tom confided in Sadie that he was considering retiring and handing over the business to one of his sons. Unbeknown to Tom, Sadie was secretly in love with Matthew, having only married Jimmy because his position as the eldest made him the obvious heir. With no chance of reconciling with Jimmy, Sadie steered Tom towards putting Matthew in charge.

As Matthew was a much better businessman than Jimmy, Sadie got her way when Tom decided to hand the business over to Matthew. However, just as Tom was about to sign the deal, Jimmy arrived and revealed Matthew and Sadie were having an affair. Tom didn't believe Jimmy at first, but when Tom mistakenly believed Sadie was making a move on him love with him, Matthew was forced to reveal the truth. Matthew didn't believe Sadie wasn't pursuing Tom, and when Tom made Matthew choose between Sadie and the business, he chose the business. However, when Sadie subsequently married the rich Alasdair Sinclair (Ray Coulthard) for his money Matthew realised he couldn't live without her and begged her for another chance, saying he'd give up the business if he had to. Faced with potentially losing another son, Tom decided to accept Matthew and Sadie as a couple.

Tom's next business venture was a development of new homes in Emmerdale, Kings River, which divided the village, as many local people couldn't afford the prices the Kings were asking. Carl got around opposition by raffling off the showhouse and rigging the competition for local couple Marlon and Donna Windsor-Dingle (Verity Rushworth) to win, creating goodwill in the community. However, Jimmy cut corners during the development, and the showhouse was destroyed by a gas explosion at the launch of the development, killing three people. Jimmy himself was trapped in the house, with only Sadie in a position to save him – but she took the opportunity to get rid of Matthew's rival for good, pushing him to what she assumed would be his death. Jimmy survived, and when Matthew discovered the truth he furiously ended things with Sadie.

Determine to get her hands on the King fortune somehow, Sadie plotted with Cain to kidnap Tom and demand a £2.5 million ransom. When he took Tom hostage, Cain faked kidnapping Sadie too, even shooting and supposedly killing her to show he meant business. Tom was traumatised, but after his sons paid the ransom it was revealed Sadie's "death" had been a stunt. Cain fled Emmerdale with the money, double-crossing Sadie in the process and forcing her to leave the village penniless.

Following the kidnapping and the failure of Kings River, Tom found himself in dire financial straits. He decided marrying Sadie's mother-in-law Rosemary Sinclair (Linda Thorson), the wealthy auntie of the notorious late aristocrat Lord Alex Oakwell (Rupam Maxwell), could be the answer to his problems. They proceeded to form a romantic partnership together as Rosemary grew interested with Tom's proposal, but Matthew was quick to suspect that Rosemary had a financial motive and discovered that her estate had been liquidated a year ago; Rosemary confined to Tom about being deeply in debt, stating stated that he was better off between the two of them. Despite learning of her secret, Tom resumed his engagement with Rosemary – much to Matthew's frustration. By then, Rosemary's son Grayson (Christopher Villiers) – who was worried he would be pushed aside by the King Brothers – was warming up to Tom. However, their relationship soon became strained when Rosemary confined to Tom that Grayson had cheated on his wife Perdita (Georgia Slowe) with men; Tom later joked about the revelation with his old friend and local police superintendent Charles Vaughan (Richard Cole), antagonizing Grayson in the process.

In the course of his impending wedding to Rosemary on Christmas Day, Grayson was far from the only enemy Tom made during his engagement. Tom was outraged to learn that Carl was reuniting with his former girlfriend Chas Dingle (Lucy Pargeter), who he believed was not good enough for his son – particularly as Tom had earlier accused Chas of abetting Cain with his kidnapping incident. When Chas grew uncomfortable with the way how Tom is neglecting responsibility for the house collapse, he bullied and later bribed her into breaking things off with Carl before throwing her out of Home Farm. When his loyal secretary Edna Birch (Shirley Stelfox) learned the truth about the Kings' alleged involvement behind the house collapse, Tom blackmailed her with the knowledge that she was the aunt of her nephew Peter (Philip Bird) – and not his son as he originally believed. Edna, refusing to be blackmailed by Tom, told Peter the truth about her secret and he left the village for good. She later delivered her evidence of the Kings' negligence behind the house collapse to the Health and Safety Executive, promoting them to investigate Tom and his sons. However, the family were quick to cover their tracks prior to the HSE's arrival – rendering Edna's evidence futile – and the organization were forced to leave Tom and his sons alone under the threat of facing arrest for harassment. The subsequent events of Edna's secret being exposed and her failed effort to condemn Tom and his sons cause her to become a recluse, which angers her friend Len Reynolds (Peter Martin) – who was secretly in love with Edna. Later on, Len confronted Tom about his cause in Edna's reclusive behaviour and they had a brief fistfight – which Carl broke up, though not Len warned Tom he would get his comeuppance one day. In the meantime, Tom has been infuriating Bob Hope (Tony Audenshaw) – the father of Dawn Woods (Julia Mallam), who had died in the Kings River explosion – over neglecting responsibility of the house collapse, and their feud continues when Tom offers Bob £100,000 in compensation to drop any further action; he refused, but after Tom increased the offer and Dawn's mother Jean Hope (Susan Penhaligon) took the money before fleeing the country with her grandson son TJ (Connor Lee), Bob furiously retaliated by burning down the King & Sons billboard sign. Bob and Jean's son Jamie (Alex Carter) helped out with his father's vendetta upon blaming Tom for the losses of both his mother and sister, while Dawn's ex-husband and TJ's father Terry Woods (Billy Hartman) – whom Tom had previously fired as his chauffeur – also held a grudge against Tom over his son's departure; at one point, Terry lashed out at Tom on the day of his wedding and assaulted him before storming off in a drunken stupor.

By the time of his wedding on Christmas Day 2006, Tom's relationships with Jimmy and Matthew are in trouble; with Jimmy being tired of being treated as a useless son and Tom favouring his brothers, while Matthew is angry because he believes Tom will leave everything to Rosemary instead of him. Ignoring their objections, Tom further angers the two when they discover that he plans to have Carl take charge of King & Sons at his earlier retirement. Tom marries Romseary and they celebrate their wedding at the Home Farm reception, where Jimmy and Matthew confront Carl over his father's plan and they fight; Tom breaks up the brawl and declares that Carl will be heir of King & Sons, causing Jimmy and Matthew to expose his one-time affections for Sadie out of spite. As the party resumes, Tom is horrified when Chas arrives in a drunken state and – despite his efforts to prevent her from speaking to his son – she reveals to Carl that he bribed her into ending their relationship; Chas then leaves after telling Tom that he will pay for "breaking her heart". Despite being alienated by his three sons, Tom and Rosemary continue to celebrate until the truth about their respective finances come to light – with Rosemary being shocked to learn that Tom plans to have Carl take charge of his estate instead of her or Grayson. Later on when the villagers watch the fireworks outside of Home Farm, Tom is struck over the head with an ornament and pushed out of his bedroom window by an unseen assailant; Tom died instantly of a broken neck. He is last seen in the mortuary as a pathologist carries out a post mortem examination on his body, and tells the police officers investigating his murder how he died.

See also 
List of soap opera villains
Emmerdale cast list

References

External links 
 http://emmerdalemurder.itv.com/site/index.php
Tom King at itv.com

Emmerdale characters
Television characters introduced in 2004
Fictional businesspeople
Male characters in television
Male villains
Fictional murdered people